Don't Mess With a Big Band (Live!) is a live album from the American swing revival band The Brian Setzer Orchestra, released in 2010.

Track listing

Disc 1

Disc 2

References

2010 live albums
The Brian Setzer Orchestra albums
Surfdog Records live albums